Gonocephalum is a genus of darkling beetles in the family Tenebrionidae.

Description
In the species of this genus the body is quite elongated, the base of pronotum is usually slightly narrower than the base of elytra. The hind wings are developed.

Species
 Gonocephalum adelaidae (Blackburn, 1894)
 Gonocephalum affine (Billberg, 1815)
 Gonocephalum alternatum Carter, 1915
 Gonocephalum arenarium (Fabricius, 1775)
 Gonocephalum assimile (Küster, 1848)
 Gonocephalum australe (Boisduval, 1835)
 Gonocephalum calvulum (Olliff, 1889)
 Gonocephalum carpentariae (Blackburn, 1894)
 Gonocephalum costatum (Brullé, 1832)
 Gonocephalum cowardense (Blackburn, 1894)
 Gonocephalum depressum (Fabricius, 1801)
 Gonocephalum dilatatum (Wollaston, 1854)
 Gonocephalum elderi (Blackburn, 1892)
 Gonocephalum granulatum (Fabricius, 1791)
 Gonocephalum hackeri Carter, 1928
 Gonocephalum hispidocostatum (Fairmaire, 1883)
 Gonocephalum insulanum (Olliff, 1888)
 Gonocephalum lefranci (Fairmaire, 1863)
 Gonocephalum macleayi (Blackburn, 1907)
 Gonocephalum mastersi (Macleay, 1872)
 Gonocephalum merensi (Uyttenboogaart, 1929)
 Gonocephalum meyricki (Blackburn, 1894)
 Gonocephalum misellum (Blackburn, 1907)
 Gonocephalum oblitum (Wollaston, 1864)
 Gonocephalum obscurum (Küster, 1849)
 Gonocephalum patruele (Erichson, 1843)
 Gonocephalum perplexum (Lucas, 1849)
 Gonocephalum prolixum (Erichson, 1843)
 Gonocephalum pubiferum Reitter, 1904
 Gonocephalum pygmaeum (Steven, 1829)
 Gonocephalum rusticum (Olivier, 1811)
 Gonocephalum setulosum (Faldermann, 1837)
 Gonocephalum subcostatum Carter, 1921
 Gonocephalum torridum (Champion, 1894)
 Gonocephalum walkeri (Champion, 1894)
 Gonocephalum yelamosi Español & Viñolas, 1983

References

 Biolib
 Fauna Europaea
 D. Iwan, J. Ferrer, and M. Ras   Catalogue of the world  Gonocephalum - Solier, 1834 List of the species and subspecies

Tenebrioninae
Tenebrionidae genera
Insect pests of millets